Junonia cymodoce, the blue leaf butterfly or blue leaf pansy, is a butterfly in the family Nymphalidae. It is found in Guinea, Ivory Coast, Ghana, Togo, Benin, Nigeria, Cameroon, Equatorial Guinea, São Tomé and Príncipe, the Republic of the Congo, Angola, the Central African Republic, the Democratic Republic of the Congo, western Uganda, western Tanzania and north-western Zambia. The habitat consists of lowland forests.

The larvae feed on Ruellia species and Asystasia gangetica.

Subspecies
 Junonia cymodoce cymodoce (Guinea, Ivory Coast, Ghana, Togo, Benin, Nigeria)
 Junonia cymodoce lugens (Schultze, 1912) (Cameroon, Bioko, São Tomé and Príncipe (Príncipe), Congo, Angola, Central African Republic, Democratic Republic of the Congo, western Uganda, western Tanzania, north-western Zambia)

References

cymod
Butterflies of Africa
Butterflies described in 1777